The year 1933 was marked, in science fiction, by the following events.

Births and deaths

Births 
 April 14 : Boris Strugatsky, Russian writer (died 2012)
 May 26 : Edward Whittemore, American writer (died 1995)
 August 7 : Jerry Pournelle, American writer (died 2017)
 August 15 : Alain Dorémieux, French writer (died 1998)

Deaths

Events

Literary releases

Novels

Stories collections

Short stories 
 The Horror in the Museum, by H. P. Lovecraft.
 Shambleau, by C. L. Moore.

Comics

Audiovisual outputs

Films 
 The Invisible Man, by James Whale.
 The Tunnel, by Curtis Bernhardt.

Awards 
The main science-fiction Awards known at the present time did not exist at this time.

See also 
 1933 in science
 1932 in science fiction
 1934 in science fiction

References

Science fiction by year

science-fiction